Rotten to the Core is a 1965 black and white British comedy film directed by John Boulting, and co-written and produced by his brother Roy Boulting. It stars Anton Rodgers, Charlotte Rampling, Eric Sykes and Ian Bannen. The film received a BAFTA nomination for Alex Vetchinsky's production design.

It was Charlotte Rampling's first credited role and she plays the main female lead. The principal comedy sections are supplied by Eric Sykes in various guises as an undercover policeman.

Plot
Upon finishing a prison sentence, a trio of crooks go in search of their one-time leader, known as "The Duke", who was supposed to safeguard their share of the money which was never recovered. However, the Duke's girlfriend Sara tells them the Duke is dead and the money is long gone. Later, the gang discover that she's lying, and that the Duke has set up a spa, the Hope Springs Nature Clinic, as a front. The Duke is planning a major heist with some criminal cronies.

The complex plot involves the police, the British Army, officers of the German army and a complicated deception by means of rail, with real German army officers being tricked into getting off the train one stop early, to be replaced by criminals in their guise. Leading the army group is Lt Vine who is successfully deceived by the whole affair (aided by Sara feeding him false information) and he has to bear the brunt of the blame.

Cast
Anton Rodgers as the Duke 
Charlotte Rampling as Sara Capell 
Eric Sykes as William Hunt 
Ian Bannen as Lt. Percy Vine 
Thorley Walters as Chief Constable Preston 
Peter Vaughan as Sir Henry Capell 
Dudley Sutton as Jelly 
Kenneth Griffith as Lenny the Dip 
James Beckett as Scapa Flood 
Victor Maddern as Anxious O'Toole
Avis Bunnage as Countess de Wett
Frank Jarvis as Moby
Raymond Huntley as Prison Governor
Dandy Nichols as Woman in Cemetery

Production
The film was based on an original idea by Roy Boulting which he gained, he told The New York Times, when recuperating from a broken neck in 1964. "Call it a cynical comment on organised thievery today," he said. Filming began in February 1965 at Shepperton Studios.

Critical reception
Time Out wrote the film had "some mildly funny moments, but most of the jokes are laboriously set up and loudly telegraphed."
Variety wrote Anton Rodgers "shows versatility in four or five characterizations...(But) the Boulting Brothers' knives are less sharp than customary." The film features Charlotte Rampling's first credited performance.

References

External links 

British comedy films
British heist films
1965 films
Films directed by John Boulting
1965 comedy films
1960s English-language films
1960s British films